The Magic Valley is a region in south-central Idaho constituting Blaine, Camas, Cassia, Gooding, Jerome, Lincoln, Minidoka, and Twin Falls counties. It is particularly associated with the agricultural region in the Snake River Plain located in the area. The northern Magic Valley region — particularly Blaine and Camas Counties — is also known as the Wood River Valley after the Big Wood River.

Demographics

According to the 2010 Census the counties of the Magic Valley region had a combined population of 185,790, or nearly 12% of Idaho. Twin Falls is the region's largest city and metropolitan area. Burley is the principal city of the region's other micropolitan area. Other cities include Jerome, Rupert, Gooding, Wendell, Bliss, Hagerman and Hailey.

History
The name "Magic Valley" is a reference to the construction of Milner and Minidoka Dams and a series of irrigation canal systems (such as the Gooding Milner canal) on the Snake River during the first decade of the 20th century. In a short time these projects "magically" transformed what had been considered a nearly uninhabitable area into some of the most productive farmland in the northwestern U.S. Many cities and towns in the region were founded between 1900 and 1910 as a direct result of these projects.

Annie Pike Greenwood wrote We Sagebrush Folks, an autobiography published in 1934 about the challenges of farm life in the area.

Education
The College of Southern Idaho (CSI) in Twin Falls is the Magic Valley's only college. Most of the region's cities and towns support separate public school districts.

Culture
Cultural events are routinely held at CSI. County fairs are held throughout the region in the late summer, the largest being the Twin Falls County Fair in Filer during the week immediately preceding Labor Day. The Sun Valley resort in Blaine County hosts several attractions throughout the year. The town of Hagerman hosts a large blues fest in September.

The Magic Valley is home to the Magic Valley Arts Council, a non-profit umbrella arts organization that serves the greater Twin Falls area and surrounding 8-county Magic Valley region. The organization's mission is to foster and promote experiences in the arts for all people in the Greater Twin Falls. It is an association of arts organizations, individuals, educational institutions and businesses looking for opportunities to improve the quality of life in the Magic Valley area by providing arts and cultural opportunities. Annual events and programs include Kids Art in the Park, Arts on Tour, Brown Bag Lecture Series, theatrical productions, the Full Moon Gallery of Fine Art and Contemporary Craft, public art projects and many others.

Leisure
Popular leisure activities in the Magic Valley include camping, hunting and fishing. Skiing at several resorts throughout the region is one of the most popular winter activities. Jackpot, Nevada, which is closely associated with the Magic Valley region, offers casino gaming. The Perrine Bridge draws many BASE jumpers from around the world. It is the only man-made structure in the USA that is legally jumpable without a permit.

Agriculture
Important agricultural commodities in the Magic Valley include rainbow trout, beans, sugar beets, corn (maize) and potatoes. Dairy production is also significant, especially in Jerome and Gooding Counties.

Cities and towns 

Acequia
Albion
Bellevue
Bliss
Buhl
Burley
Carey
Castleford
Declo
Dietrich
Eden
Fairfield
Filer
Gooding
Hagerman
Hailey
Hansen
Hazelton
Heyburn
Hollister
Jerome
Ketchum
Kimberly
Malta
Minidoka
Murtaugh
Oakley
Paul
Picabo
Richfield
Rogerson
Rupert
Shoshone
Sun Valley
Triumph
Twin Falls
Wendell

See also
Sun Valley
Treasure Valley

References

Regions of Idaho